Jasieniec  is a village in Grójec County, Masovian Voivodeship, in east-central Poland. It is the seat of the gmina (administrative district) called Gmina Jasieniec.

The village has a population of 1200.

References

Villages in Grójec County